Idols of Exile is a 2005 album by Jason Collett.

Track listing
"Fire" - with Amy Millan
"Hangover Days" - with Emily Haines
"Brownie Hawkeye"
"We All Lose One Another"
"Parry Sound"
"I'll Bring the Sun"
"Tinsel and Sawdust"
"Feral Republic"
"Pavement Puddle Stars"
"Almost Summer"
"Pink Night"
"These Are the Days"

Personnel
Ravenna Barker - backing vocals, handclaps
Howie Beck - production, basses, drums, various other percussion, harmonica
Chris Brown - clavinet, organ
Julian Brown - bass
Brendan Canning - piano, electric guitar, bass
Andrew Cash - backing vocals, handclaps
Jason Collett - vocals, guitars
Evan Cranley - trombone, backing vocals
Kevin Drew - backing vocals, electric guitar, handclaps
Bob Egan - pedal steel
Leslie Feist - backing vocals
Patrick Gilmour - backing vocals, handclaps
Emily Haines - vocals
Gabrielle Hrynkiw - backing vocals, handclaps
Afie Jurvanen - electric guitar
Kersti Mcleod - backing vocals, handclaps
Amy Millan - backing vocals
Liam O'Neil - synth
Julie Penner - violin
Justin Peroff - toms
Tony Scherr - bass, electric guitar
James Shaw - trumpet, backing vocals
Charles Spearin - banjo
Jason Tait - vibes, glockenspiel, saw, tuning fork
Paul Taylor - piano
Andrew Whiteman - guitars, tres

References

2005 albums
Jason Collett albums
Arts & Crafts Productions albums